Gareis is a surname. Notable people with the surname include:

 Jennifer Gareis  (born 1970), American actress
 Franz Gareis (1775–1803), German painter
 Martin Gareis (1891–1976), German general during World War II
 Roland Gareis (born 1948), Austrian economist
 Karl von Gareis (1844–1923), German legal scholar

Surnames from given names